The Corps of King's Messengers (or Corps of Queen's Messengers during the reign of a female monarch) are couriers employed by the British Foreign, Commonwealth and Development Office (FCDO). They hand-carry secret and important documents to British embassies, high commissions, and consulates around the world. Many King’s Messengers were retired Army personnel. Messengers generally travel in plain clothes in business class on scheduled airlines with their consignment. The division's official name changes depending on the gender of the reigning monarch.

The safe passage of diplomatic baggage is guaranteed by Articles 27 and 36 of the Vienna Convention on Diplomatic Relations, and for reasons of state secrecy, the diplomatic bag does not go through normal airport baggage checks and must not be opened, X-rayed, weighed, or otherwise investigated by customs of a foreign state, airline security staff or anyone else. The only exception is if there is serious evidence that it might contain materials prohibited or controlled by quarantine in the destination state. The King’s Messenger has the status of a diplomatic courier and cannot be detained by foreign governments. British diplomatic bags and King’s Messengers do not benefit from these immunities in the UK, and HMRC has the right to examine UK diplomatic bags. The messenger and the messenger's personal luggage can be required to go through normal security screening.

History 

The formal role and title ‘Royal Messenger’, whether to King or Queen, is most certainly evident within the retinues of the English monarchy, certainly extending back to the early 12th century. They were termed 'Nuncii' or 'Cursores', depending on whether they travelled by horse or foot, and were well paid. Their role was sufficiently important that individuals with this role can be identified in records from the reigns of Kings John, Henry III, and the first three Edwards. They carried messages around England and to other countries on behalf of the government. They were the primary means for communication with local officials such as sheriffs and mayors and travelled in circuits so that the King and his staff had regular updates on the actions that had been commanded. They also sometimes transported money or valuables around the country. The number employed was between 30 and 60. 

A noted 15th century King's Messenger was John Norman, who was appointed in 1485 by King Richard III to hand-deliver secret documents. During his exile, Charles II appointed four trusted men to convey messages to Royalist forces in England. As a sign of their authority, the King broke four silver greyhounds from a bowl familiar to royal courtiers, and gave one to each man. A silver greyhound thus became the symbol of the Service. On formal occasions, the Queen's Messengers wear this badge from a ribbon, and on less formal occasions male messengers wear ties with a discreet greyhound pattern while working.

In 1824 the messengers became a formal part of the UK Foreign Office.

Modern day

Modern communications have diminished the role of the Queen's Messengers, but as original confidential documents still need to be conveyed securely between countries, their function remains valuable, but declining.

In 1995 a parliamentary question put the number of Messengers then at 27. The number in March 2015 was sixteen full-time and two part-time, and the departmental headcount was nineteen. In December 2015 an article in the Daily Express suggested that the Queen's Messenger service was "facing the chop by cost-cutting Foreign Office mandarins who see them as a legacy of a by-gone age". However the service continues, as part of the secure logistics operation of FCDO Services, part of the Foreign Office. 

The British Rail Class 67 diesel locomotive 67005 bears the name Queen's Messenger.

King's Messengers have been officially ratified by King Charles III. This happened in November 2022 - info provided by a former Queens Messenger recently retired.

See also
 Diplomatic courier
 BSAA Star Dust was carrying a King's Messenger at the time of its disappearance.
 SS Berlin was carrying Mr Herbert, a King's Messenger, at the time of its sinking.
 The Queen's Messenger (TV drama)

References

Further reading
 Antrobus, George Pollock, and Cecil Hunt. King's Messenger, 1918-1940, Memoirs of a Silver Greyhound. London: H. Jenkins, 1941.
 Bamber, Iain. From Pouch to Passport: A History of Kings & Queens Messenger Insignia. Mandurah, W.A.: DB Publishing, 2009.
 O'Brien-Twohig, Michael. Diplomatic Courier. Elek Books, 1960.
 Wheeler-Holohan, Vincent. The History of the King's Messengers. London: Grayson & Grayson, 1935.

External links
 Queen's Messenger Story 1952, British Pathe film, 7:42 mins. Can be viewed online
FCDO link for the Queen's Messengers 

Diplomats by role
Foreign, Commonwealth and Development Office
British monarchy